Tenor Time is an album by the American jazz tenor saxophonist Joe Lovano, released on February 19, 1999, on somethin`else (Toshiba EMI).

Track listing

Personnel
Joe Lovano - tenor saxophone
Junko Onishi - piano
Rodney Whitaker - double bass
Al Foster - drums

Production
Producer - Michael Cuscuna, Joe Lovano
Executive producer - Hitoshi Namekata
Recording engineer - Jim Anderson
Recorded at Avatar Studios, New York City on September 29, 1996
Mastering engineer - Yoshio Okazaki
Photograph - Jimmy Kayz
Art director - Kaoru Taku
A&R - Yoshiko Tsuge
 Liner notes - Michael Cuscuna, Shouhei Cyujyou

Release history

References

1997 albums
Joe Lovano albums
Junko Onishi albums
albums produced by Michael Cuscuna